Barmasia railway station (station code BRMA) is at Barmasia village in Dumka district in the Indian state of Jharkhand on the Jasidih – Rampurhat section. It is in the Howrah Division of the Eastern Railway zone of the Indian Railways.

This railway track to Dumka is a boon for Santhal Pargana Division.

The Barmasia railway station provides rail connectivity to the nearby villages Gopalpur, Syampur, Bucham, Kuspahari, Patabari.

History
Barmasia railway station became operation in 2014. The  segment from Dumka to Rampurhat became operational on 30 June 2014.

Station layout

Trains
One passenger train runs between Jasidih Junction and Rampurhat stop at Barmasia railway station.

Track layout

See also

References

External links 

 Ministry of Railways. (Official site)

 Official website of the Dumka district

Railway stations in Dumka district
Howrah railway division
Railway stations in India opened in 2014